John Legh (fl. 1379) was a Member of Parliament for Surrey in 1379.

References

Year of birth missing
Year of death missing
14th-century English people
Members of the Parliament of England for Surrey
English MPs 1379